Prince Wangwi was a Korean Royal Prince as the first and oldest son of Taejo of Goryeo and Queen Jeongdeok. He was a Buddhism.

In popular culture
Portrayed by Park Sun-ho in the 2015 MBC TV series Shine or Go Crazy.

References

Korean princes
Year of birth unknown
Year of death unknown